A special election for Zamboanga del Norte's 1st district seat in the House of Representatives of the Philippines was held on August 26, 2002. Held due to Representative Romeo Jalosjos being dropped from the rolls after being convicted with finality for rape of a minor, Jalosjos' sister won the special election convincingly.

District profile 
Zamboanga del Norte's 1st congressional district is found in the northern part of the province. Romeo Jalosjos has held the district since winning in 1995.

Campaign
The House of Representatives dropped incumbent representative Romeo Jalosjos from the rolls after his conviction for rape of a minor was rendered final by the Supreme Court on November 15, 2001. Jalosjos, who was accused of rape in 1996, was originally convicted by the Makati Regional Trial Court, and sentenced to two life terms aside from penalties from six counts of lasciviousness, but still won reelection in 2001. The vacancy caused the House of Representatives to ask the Commission on Elections to call for a special election.

Four candidates filed the paperwork to run for the vacant seat:
Cecilia Jalosjos Carreon, Piñan mayor and Jalosjos' sister (Partido ng Demokratikong Reporma-Lapiang Malaya).
Orlando Salatandre Jr., a former member of the Zamboanga del Norte Provincial Board, and one of the defense counsels of Ruben Ecleo Jr.
Archie Adaza, son of former Representative Artemio Adaza (Lakas-NUCD-UMDP).
Elly Pamatong, legal counsel of Nur Misuari.

Result

Carreon won via landslide, earning 64,000 votes. She will serve until 2004, or her brother's unfinished term. She is sworn in by President Gloria Macapagal Arroyo on August 29 at Sergio Osmeña.

Aftermath 
The seat became a stronghold of the Jalosjos family. Carreon won in the 2004 and 2007 general election. Romeo' son Bullet won in 2010, and defended the seat two more times until he was term-limited in 2019. Romeo's son and Bullet's brother, Romeo Jr., won in 2019.

References

2002 elections in the Philippines
Special elections to the Congress of the Philippines
Elections in Zamboanga del Norte